Xerocomellus is a genus of fungi in the family Boletaceae. The genus, as it was described in 2008, contained 12 species.  However X. rubellus and X. engelii  were transferred to the new genus Hortiboletus and X. armeniacus was transferred to the new genus Rheubarbariboletus in 2015. Molecular analysis supports the distinction of Xerocomellus species from Boletus and Xerocomus, within which these species were formerly contained.  Xerocomellus in fact is only distantly related to Xerocomus and is most closely related to Tylopilus, Boletus sensu stricto, Porphyrellus, Strobilomyces, and Xanthoconium.

Taxonomy 
Members of the genus had been classified either in the genus Boletus or Xerocomus until Czech mycologist Josef Šutara examined a number of species and concluded that there was a defined group containing X. chrysenteron, X. armeniacus and relatives that are distinct morphologically from the group containing Xerocomus subtomentosus and related species. He deferred fully delimiting the genus until genetic work confirmed their distinctness. Previously, Manfred Binder had coined the term Paraxerocomus for the group but this was not officially published.

The type species is the red-cracked bolete (Xerocomellus chrysenteron).

Genetic analysis published in 2013 showed that X. chrysenteron and X. zelleri form a Xerocomellus clade within a larger group informally called "anaxoboletus" in the Boletineae. It appears to have affinities with what was then known informally as the "rubellus clade", which contained the species X. rubellus and X. armeniacus, now known as Hortiboletus rubellus and Rheubarbariboletus armeniacus respectively. The same study found Xerocomellus to be more distantly to a 'badius' clade containing Boletus badius, now known as Imleria badia, and relatives. Other clades in the group include the porcini (true Boletus species) and Strobilomyces clades, species currently designated Xerocomus (the species are not true Xerocomus species), and smaller genera whose relationships are unclear.

Description 
Members of the genus have small to medium-size fruit bodies with more slender stipes compared with other boletes. They are often brightly coloured. The caps are dry and do not become sticky when wet. Their cuticle tissue is a palisadoderm, comprising parallel or roughly parallel hypha arranged in an anticlinal fashion. The palisoderm, which is generally between 120 and 350 μm thick (although extremes of 80 μm and 500 μm are known), maintains its characteristic arrangement for longer periods than other boletes. The tubes are generally yellow and adnate or slightly decurrent. The pores are also yellow and quite large, up to 2.5 mm in diameter each and angular in shape. The spores are generally spindle-shaped to oval and have a smooth or striate surface. The spore print is brown or slightly olive-tinged when fresh.

Morphological Features of Xerocomoid Boletes

Ecology 
Xerocomellus species form mycorrhizal associations with coniferous and deciduous trees.

Species

References

External links 

Boletaceae
Boletales genera